Atalaya salicifolia is a species of tree native to dry rainforests of tropical and subtropical Australia, New Guinea and Malesia. The leaves of smaller trees of this species have a distinct winged rachis, in larger trees the rachis becomes increasingly cylindrical.

References

salicifolia
Flora of Queensland